Anuradha is the seventeenth nakshatra (lunar mansion) in Hindu astrology having a spread from 3°20' to 16°40'. Anuradha is ruled by Shani (Saturn).
Mitra is the deity for Anuradha Nakshatra. Anuradha is a fragile nakshatra with the shakti power of granting abundance. Anuradha rules the breasts, stomach, womb and bowels.

See also

 Archaeoastronomy and Vedic chronology
 History of astrology
 Indian astronomy
 Nadi astrology
 Synoptical astrology

References

Nakshatra